is the third studio album by Japanese singer-songwriter Yōsui Inoue, released in December 1973.

Overview and song information
Kōri no Sekai was recorded after a single "Yume No Naka e" (夢の中へ) became a smash hit. Part of the recording took place at the Trident and Advision studios in London, United Kingdom, with musicians including two former members of the band Quatermass, John Gustafson and Pete Robinson. Three of them including title track were co-arranged by Nicky Harrison. Harrison was also the strings arranger for The Rolling Stones' Goats Head Soup album, which topped the chart in the U.S. and UK in Autumn 1973.

A song "Kokoro Moyou" was released as a lead single in September 1973 and became his first top-ten charting hit consequently, peaking at #7 on the Oricon. It was originally titled "Futsū Yūbin" and written for the folk duo Betsy & Chris, but the pair refused to record his song. A pop idol Saori Minami covered "Kokoro Moyou" on her album Natsu no Kanjou released in a following year. Ayaka Hirahara and Akina Nakamori also recorded the song in later years.

Flip side of a single "Kokoro Moyou" was "Kaerenai Futari", a ballad Inoue and Kiyoshirō Imawano wrote together. Reportedly, then-unknown co-writer eked out a living by the income of the song, until he became popular as a frontman of the band RC Succession in the 1980s. Imawano joined the songwriting on "Machibouke" too, and occasionally collaborated with Inoue in later years.

The lead-off track of the album was initially written by Inoue alone, and it was previously issued on his live album Modori Michi. The studio recording version of "Akazu no Fumikiri" heard on Kōri no Sekai is completely different song, which features renewed composition by the arranger Katz Hoshi.

Commercial success
Yōsui Inoue's Kōri no Sekai album marked unprecedented success for the Japanese music industry at the time, becoming the first long-playing record that has retailed more than a million copies in Japan alone. Universal Music Group stated that the vinyl release of Kori no Sekai was sold more than 1.35 million copies. Comprising other formats such as audio cassette and compact disc, the album has sold over 1.45 million copies to date.

In the history of the Oricon Albums chart started in 1970, Kōri no Sekai has been the album with the most weeks at number-one. About two weeks after the release, the album topped  the Japanese Oricon Weekly LP chart for the first time, and stayed there for 13 consecutive weeks. Since then, it continuously remained on the top-ten of the chart for 113 weeks, and returned to the number-one spot again and again, while Inoue himself subsequently released some albums. Eventually Kōri no Sekai entered the Oricon for 150 weeks, spending 35 weeks in total at the top.

Track listing
All songs written and composed by Yōsui Inoue (except where indicated)

Side one
All songs arranged by Katz Hoshi (except "Chie-Chan" and "Kōri no Sekai" co-arranged by Nick Harrison)
"" (Inoue/Katz Hoshi) - 2:34
"" - 0:35
"" (Inoue/Kiyoshirō Imawano) - 4:20
"" - 2:43
"" - 4:11
"" (Inoue/Kei Ogura) - 2:27
"" - 2:38

Side two
All songs arranged by Katz Hoshi (except "Fun" co-arranged by Nick Harrison)
"" - 3:25
"" (Inoue/Imawano) - 2:41
"" (Inoue/Kunio Nagatani) - 3:05
"Fun" - 2:40
"" - 3:07
"" - 2:51

Personnel
Barry DeSouza - Drums
Tatsuo Hayashi - Drums
Shuichi Murakami - Drums
Tadaaki Misago - Drums
Peter Robinson - Piano, mellotron, harpsichord
Ann Odell - Piano
Jun Fukamachi - Piano, synthesizer, Mellotron
Naoya Matsuoka - Piano
John Gustafson - Electric bass
Haruomi Hosono - Electric bass
Takao Yamamura - Electric bass
Masayoshi Takanaka - Electric guitar. Bass guitar
Joe Gammer - Electric guitar
Mark Warner - Electric guitar
Ray Fenwick - Acoustic guitar
Hiromi Yasuda - Acoustic guitar, flat mandolin
Yosui Inoue - Vocals, acoustic guitar, blues harp
Judd Mcniven - Blues harp
Toshiyui Ōe - Steel guitar
Toshio Tanioka - Violin
Arrival - Chorus
Katz Hoshi - Chorus

Awards

Chart positions

Album

Single

Release history

External links 
 An account of Kori no Sekai (Made in Japan ONLY)

References

1973 albums
Yōsui Inoue albums